Birgit Prinz (born 25 October 1977) is a German former footballer, two-time FIFA Women's World Cup champion and three-time FIFA World Player of the Year. In addition to the German national team, Prinz played for 1. FFC Frankfurt in the Frauen-Bundesliga as well as the Carolina Courage in the Women's United Soccer Association (WUSA), the first professional women's league in the United States. Prinz remains one of the game's most prolific strikers and is the second FIFA Women's World Cup all-time leading scorer with 14 goals (second only to Marta from Brazil). In 2011, she announced the end of her active career. She currently works as a sport psychologist for the men's and women's teams of Bundesliga club TSG 1899 Hoffenheim.

Club career
Prinz began her career at SV Dörnigheim FC. She made her Bundesliga debut for FSV Frankfurt, where she played from 1993 to 1998. During that time Prinz won two Bundesliga titles and two German Cups. In 1997 and 1998 she was the Bundesliga top scorer. In 1998, she moved to local rivals 1. FFC Frankfurt, where she has had her biggest success at club level. In 13 seasons at the club, Prinz won six Bundesliga and eight German Cup titles. She also won the Bundesliga top-scorer award twice more in 2001 and 2007. Prinz won the UEFA Women's Cup three times with Frankfurt, in the 2001–02, 2005–06 and 2007–08 seasons. She also reached the final in 2004, but lost to the Swedish side Umeå IK.

For two seasons, Prinz joined Carolina Courage in the professional women's league WUSA in the United States. During her short stint in America she claimed the 2002 WUSA Championship. After the 2003 World Cup, Prinz declined an offer from AC Perugia to play in Italy's men's Serie A, fearing her transfer would be used as a publicity stunt and she would end up on the bench.

In her time at FFC Frankfurt, Prinz won many personal awards, including a record eight German Female Footballer of the Year awards from 2001 to 2008. She was named the FIFA World Player of the Year in 2003, 2004 and 2005. For four consecutive years from 2007 to 2010 she came second, behind Brazil's Marta.

International career

At the age of 16, Prinz made her debut for the Germany national team in July 1994 against Canada. She came on after 72 minutes and scored the game-winner in the 89th minute. One year later, she won her first major title at the 1995 European Championship, scoring in the final. In the same year, she was named to Germany's squad for the 1995 FIFA Women's World Cup, where they lost to Norway in the final match. She remains the youngest player ever to appear in a World Cup Final.

For the next decade, Prinz had one of the most successful international careers in women's football. She won four more UEFA European Championships in 1997, 2001, 2005 and 2009. At the Summer Olympics she won bronze three times with the German team, in 2000, 2004 and 2008. At the 2003 FIFA Women's World Cup, Prinz helped Germany win its first World Cup title in the women's game. She was honoured as the tournament's best player and top-scorer. Prinz became the women's national team captain at the end of 2003, and remained until her retirement. Four years later, at the 2007 FIFA Women's World Cup, she captained the team to Germany's second World Cup title; she was awarded the Silver Ball as the second-best player at the tournament.

Prinz holds several national and international records. With 14 goals, she is the second all-time leading goalscorer at FIFA Women's World Cups. From 2008 until 2012, Prinz and Brazil's Cristiane both held the tournament record of ten goals at the Summer Olympics, although Cristiane has now surpassed Prinz. For the German national team Prinz appeared 214 times and scored 128 goals, and is the team's most capped player and top goalscorer.

Personal life
Prinz is a trained physical therapist. In 2010, she graduated with her master's degree in psychology from the Goethe University Frankfurt. Since January 2012, she has worked as a sport psychologist in the youth academy, women's U-17 and women's Bundesliga teams at TSG 1899 Hoffenheim.

Career statistics

International
Scores and results list Germany's goal tally first, score column indicates score after each Prinz goal.

Goals by competition

At World Cup and Olympic Tournaments
Prinz competed in five FIFA Women's World Cup:
Sweden 1995,
USA 1999,
USA 2003,
China 2007;
and Germany 2011;
and four Olympics:
Atlanta 1996,
Sydney 2000,
Athens 2004,
and Beijing 2008. 
Altogether she played in 43 matches and scored 24 goals at those nine global tournaments. With Germany, Prinz is a two-time world champion from USA 2003 and China 2007, and a runner-up from Sweden 1995, as well as a three-time bronze medalist from Sydney 2000, Athens 2004 and Beijing 2008.

Honours
FSV Frankfurt
 Bundesliga: 1994–95, 1997–98
 German Cup: 1994–95, 1995–96

1. FFC Frankfurt
 UEFA Women's Cup: 2001–02, 2005–06, 2007–08; runner-up 2003–04
 Bundesliga (7): 1998–99, 2000–01, 2001–02, 2002–03, 2004–05, 2006–07, 2007–08
 German Cup (8): 1998–99, 1999-00, 2000–01, 2001–02, 2002–03, 2006–07, 2007–08, 2010–11

Germany
 WUSA Championship: 2002

 FIFA World Cup: 2003, 2007; runner-up 1995
 UEFA European Championship: 1995, 1997, 2001, 2005, 2009
 Olympic bronze medal: 2000, 2004, 2008
 Algarve Cup: 2006

Individual
 FIFA World Player of the Year: 2003, 2004, 2005; runner-up 2002, 2007, 2008, 2009, 2010
 German Player of the Year (8): 2001, 2002, 2003, 2004, 2005, 2006, 2007, 2008
 UEFA Women's Championship Golden Player: 1995
 Second all-time leading goalscorer FIFA Women's World Cup – 14 goals (second to Marta)
 Second all-time leading goalscorer Women's Olympic Football Tournament – 10 goals (second to Cristiane)
 Golden Ball: 2003 FIFA Women's World Cup
 FIFA Women's World Cup top scorer: 2003
 2003 FIFA Women's World Cup All star team: 2003
 Silver Ball: 2007 FIFA Women's World Cup
 2007 FIFA Women's World Cup All star team: 2007
 Bundesliga top scorer: 1996–97, 1997–98, 2000–01, 2006–07
 Silbernes Lorbeerblatt: 2003, 2007

See also
 List of women's footballers with 100 or more international goals
 List of women's footballers with 100 or more international caps
 List of players who have won multiple FIFA Women's World Cups
 List of German women's football champions
 List of FIFA Women's World Cup hat-tricks 
 List of Olympic medalists in football
 List of UEFA Women's Championship goalscorers
 List of UEFA Women's Championship records

References

Match reports

External links

 
   
 Profile at the German Football Federation
 
 

1977 births
Living people
Footballers from Frankfurt
Women's association football forwards
Footballers at the 1996 Summer Olympics
Footballers at the 2000 Summer Olympics
Footballers at the 2004 Summer Olympics
Footballers at the 2008 Summer Olympics
German women's footballers
Germany women's international footballers
1995 FIFA Women's World Cup players
1999 FIFA Women's World Cup players
2003 FIFA Women's World Cup players
2007 FIFA Women's World Cup players
Olympic footballers of Germany
FIFA World Player of the Year winners
Olympic bronze medalists for Germany
Women's association football midfielders
Women's United Soccer Association players
German expatriate women's footballers
German expatriate sportspeople in the United States
Expatriate women's soccer players in the United States
1. FFC Frankfurt players
FSV Frankfurt (women) players
FIFA Century Club
Olympic medalists in football
2011 FIFA Women's World Cup players
Recipients of the Silver Laurel Leaf
Medalists at the 2008 Summer Olympics
Medalists at the 2004 Summer Olympics
Carolina Courage players
FIFA Women's World Cup-winning captains
FIFA Women's World Cup-winning players
Medalists at the 2000 Summer Olympics
UEFA Women's Championship-winning players